Juan Bautista Alegre y Levantino (February 2, 1882 – June 14, 1931) was a Filipino statesman, a delegate of the first Philippine Independence Mission of 1919 to Washington, D.C., Secretary of the National Committee of the Philippine Independence Commission of 1922, a member of the first Philippine Independence Congress of 1930, and Senator of the Philippines.

Biography 
Juan B. Alegre was born on February 2, 1882, in Casiguran in the province of Sorsogon in the Bicol Peninsula. In 1926, he later moved residence to what is now known as Barangay San Juan in Irosin.

Alegre was an abaca plantation owner and reportedly one of the wealthiest citizens of the Philippines of his time. He was the president of the Chamber of Commerce of the Philippine Islands from 1920 to 1921, and one of the financiers of the Philippines Herald newspaper. Juan B. Alegre was married to Amanda Sargent and survived by four of his children.

After completing his training in the Philippines, Juan B. Alegre attended Yale University from 1903 to 1905 but had to leave his 3Ls in Yale Law School, abetted by business concerns from the death of his father, Narciso Alegre Pellicer.

In 1922, he was elected to the Senate of the Philippines for the Sixth Senatorial District on behalf of the Nacionalista Party. Three years later, Alegre was re-elected to the 7th Philippine Legislature. However, after being defeated for a third term in the 1928 Senate elections by another member of the Nacionalista Party, he joined the Democrata Party.

On behalf of the Demócratas, he succeeded afterwards in being re-elected again to the Senate. But before Alegre could take his place in the 9th Philippine Legislature, however, he died in his home in Manila after being sworn to office at the age of 49, on June 14, 1931 from complications of gastric ulcer. His vacancy was filled by Jose O. Vera by special elections.  The late Senator Alegre is remembered by the thoroughfare named in his honor, fronting the Sorsogon Provincial Capitol and Park.

Images

See also
 List of Philippine legislators who died in office

References

1882 births
1931 deaths
Bicolano people
Bicolano politicians
Burials at La Loma Cemetery
Nacionalista Party politicians
People from Sorsogon
Senators of the 6th Philippine Legislature
Senators of the 7th Philippine Legislature
Senators of the 9th Philippine Legislature
Senators from Sorsogon
The Philippines Herald
Elected officials who died without taking their seats